Ilie Năstase and Tom Okker were the defending champions, but lost in the quarterfinals this year.

Per Hjertquist and Steve Krulevitz won the title, defeating Eric Fromm and Cary Leeds 7–6, 6–3 in the final.

Seeds

  Ilie Năstase /  Tom Okker (quarterfinals)
  Heinz Günthardt /  Chris Mayotte (semifinals)
  Eddie Edwards /  Leo Palin (quarterfinals)
  Per Hjertquist /  Steve Krulevitz (champions)

Draw

Draw

External links
 Draw

Tel Aviv Open
1980 Grand Prix (tennis)